Geoffrey William Griffin OBE (13 June 1933 in Eldoret – 28 June 2005) was the founding director of Starehe Boys' Centre and School in Kenya. He founded the center in November, 1959 with the help of  Geoffrey Gatama Geturo and Joseph Kamiru Gikubu.  He was director of the center from its founding to his death in 2005. He was also the founding director of the National Youth Service between 1964 and 1988.

In addition to their duties at Starehe Centre, Griffin and Geturo were appointed (and re-appointed) members of Kenya's Central Probation Commission. The Commission was a group appointed by Daniel arap Moi, the second President of Kenya, who at the time of the 1974 Commission was acting in his capacity as Vice-President and Minister for Home Affairs, a ministry responsible for all non-foreign affairs of the country.

Education 
Griffin had his primary education at Kitale school then proceeded for high school at The Prince of Wales School, Nairobi, Kenya between 1945-1950, ( which later changed its name to Nairobi School) 

After leaving school before completing the additional two years of advanced high school required for admission to university in Kenya, he first joined the Survey of Kenya, and then the King's African Rifles (KAR). After serving during the Emergency, and tired of the brutality of war, he became convinced of the justice of the Mau Mau cause. He did not renew his commission, and began to participate in attempts to rehabilitate former fighters held or recently released from detention camps. After some years, his attention turned to children orphaned by the war, and he started a rescue center, out of which grew Starehe.

Honours 
Griffin was awarded an honorary Ph.D. in Education by Kenyatta University for developing Starehe Boys' Centre and School.

He was awarded the MBS (Moran of the Order of the Burning Spear) by President Kenyatta in 1970, the MGH (Moran of the Order of the Golden Heart) by President Daniel arap Moi in 1986, appointed an Officer in the Order of the British Empire (OBE) by Queen Elizabeth II in 2002, and a Lifetime Achievement Award by the Kenya National Commission on Human Rights in 2005.

Starehe Boys' Centre 

Griffin, together with Joseph Kamiru Gikubu and Geoffrey Gatama Geturo,  founded Starehe Boys' Centre in July, 1959. The Centre then only had two tiny huts erected by donation from the Shell-BP Petroleum Company, which served as dormitories for the first waifs brought in from the streets. Kenya was going through a tough time under the tough Emergency Regulations declared in 1952. It was amid suspicion and even hostility from some of the authorities, local people and the first boys themselves that the Centre was officially opened on 14 November 1959.

Starehe offers free and high-quality education to many orphaned and poor African children, on a model similar to Christ's Hospital. Many alumni are now prominent people in Kenya and the world. Raphael Tuju, former cabinet minister and current secretary general of the Jubilee party; Paul Ereng, Olympic gold Medalist; Dr. Amrose Misore, former Senior Deputy Director of Medical Services, and by 2010 Project Director of PATH's USAID-funded AIDS Population & Health Integrated Assistance Program (APHIA) II Western; and Prof. George Magoha, Medical Surgeon & Urologist, was Vice-Chancellor of the University of Nairobi and current Minister of Education, are Old Stareheans.

Death 
Geoffrey Griffin died on 28 June 2005, at the Nairobi Hospital at the age of 72 after succumbing to cancer of the colon. He had led Starehe for 46 years. He was buried on 8 July 2005 inside the chapel of Starehe Boys Centre and School.

During the burial ceremony of the late Geoffrey Griffin, the then President of the Republic of Kenya eulogized Griffin as a true patriot and a great friend of Kenya’s youth.

The late Geoffrey Griffin's final words were read to the students during the burial ceremony, saying:

"This world is full of people who do their duty half-heartedly, grudgingly and poorly. Don’t be like them. Whatever your duty is, do it as fully and as perfectly as you can. And when you have finished your duty go on to spare some of your time and talent in service to less fortunate people, not for any reward at all, but because it is the right thing to do. Follow my advice on this and I promise you that your lives will be happy and successful. May God bless you all."

Remembrance 
On 19 June 2009, President Mwai Kibaki launched The Griffin Memorial Endowment Trust to cater to the educational needs of bright but needy children.

On Saturday, 21 July 2018, during the 59th Founders’ Day Celebration at Starehe Boys Centre, Nairobi County Governor Mike Sonko renamed Ngara Ring Road to Dr. Geoffrey William Griffin Road in honor of the founder of the Starehe Boys Centre.

Notes

External links
TimesOnline obituary, The Times; 18 August 2005.
Kwamchetsi Makokha, Starehe founder Griffin dies at 72 The East African Standard; 29 June 2005.

Bibliography
Geoffrey Griffin (1994) School Mastery: Straight Talk About Boarding School Management in Kenya, (Nairobi: Lectern Publications).
Roger Martin (1978) Anthem of bugles: the story of Starehe Boys Centre and School, (Nairobi, London : Heinemann Educational).
Kennedy O.A. Hongo & Jesse N.K. Mugambi (2000) Starehe Boys Centre: School and Institute. The first forty years 1959-1999 (Nairobi: Acton Publishers)

1933 births
2005 deaths
Kenyan educators
Alumni of Nairobi School
Officers of the Order of the British Empire
Morans of the Order of the Burning Spear
Morans of the Order of the Golden Heart of Kenya
Kenyan people of Welsh descent